Canada's Worst Driver 11 was the eleventh season of the Canadian reality TV show Canada's Worst Driver, which aired on the Discovery Channel. As with previous years, eight people, nominated by their family or friends, enter the Driver Rehabilitation Centre to improve their driving skills. This season, however, nine people (because Shmuel Hoffman and his younger brother, Sholom, nominated each other and, thus, entered rehab together) entered the Driver Rehabilitation Centre to improve their driving skills. The focus of this season was on High-Speed Driving. This year, the Driver Rehabilitation Centre is located at the Dunnville Airport in Dunnville, Ontario for the sixth straight season. The initial drive started in Cayuga, Ontario and the final road test occurred in Hamilton, Ontario.

Experts
 Cam Woolley is the show's longest-serving expert, having been present in every season except the first and has seen the habits of Canadian drivers change drastically since 2000, with the most common offense having changed from DUI to distracted driving. He is the traffic expert on CP24 in Toronto and had a 25-year career as a traffic sergeant with the Ontario Provincial Police.
 Philippe Létourneau is a veteran high-speed driving instructor who counts BMW and Ferrari among his clients. Since joining the show in the third season, the average car has gained considerably in speed and acceleration, with the high-speed emphasis of this season making his job a particularly important one.
 Shyamala Kiru is the show's resident psychotherapist and relationship expert, a position which has become more demanding each year since joining the show in the seventh season, as the stresses in driving and everyday life seem to always be on the increase.
 Tim Danter is the show's head driving instructor, a position he has held since joining the show in the eighth season. In this position, he not only gives the drivers help and instructions for challenges, but gives them further lessons off-screen. With Tim returning for his fourth season (breaking a three-way tie with original head driving instructor Scott Marshall and his predecessor, Peter Mellor), that officially makes him the longest-tenured head instructor in Canada's Worst Driver history.

Contestants
This season features nine contestants, up from the eight featured in the tenth season:
 Renee Boily, 26, from Winnipeg, Manitoba, is a mother who suffers from severe nerves and anxiety to the extent that she constantly drives well below the speed limit, avoids highways at all costs and even refuses to drive her five-year-old son, Ryder, anywhere. Her cousin, Jacque Ehm, has brought her to rehab to get her help. She drives a beige Pontiac Sunfire and drove a red Chevrolet Cobalt to the rehab centre.
 Tina Cook, 46, from Niagara Falls, Ontario, is a mother and grandmother who, by her own admission, is also a perpetually road-raging driver, something evidenced by the profanity-filled stickers which adorn her car. She is nominated by Ashley Cook, one of her six children, out of concern that her behaviour will eventually get her banned from driving, into a serious accident or both. She drives a black Chevrolet Silverado.
 Cameron Donavin, 23 and licensed for four years, from Calgary, Alberta, is a radio newsreader who has done relatively little driving since getting his license. He drives a white Pontiac Sunfire and drove a silver Chevrolet Cobalt to the rehab centre.
 Shmuel Hoffman, 30 and licensed for six months and Sholom Hoffman, 26 and licensed for eight months, from Calgary, Alberta, are brothers who still live together and recently earned their driving licenses but have different issues, with Shmuel being prone to road rage and Sholom being easily distracted. The two brothers nominated each other and were considered equally poor drivers by the producers, making them the first pair of contestants to also act as nominators for each other. Shmuel drives a red Chevrolet Silverado and Sholom drives a black Chevrolet Spark and both drove a purple Pontiac Montana SV6 to the rehab centre. 
 Jillian Matthews, 24 and licensed for five years, from The Goulds, Newfoundland and Labrador, had her confidence in her driving wrecked after getting involved in two accidents in the same day in 2011 and required repeated "practice runs" with her fiancé, Mitchell Kieley, just to be able to drive to her new job, resulting in Mitchell bringing her to rehab to help her regain her confidence. She drives a black Mitsubishi Lancer and drove a black Volkswagen Jetta to the rehab centre.
 Alexander "Alex" Morrison, 25, from Markham, Ontario (near Toronto), takes a very relaxed approach to driving, including not paying attention to the speed limit or other road users and using his knees to steer the car while he eats and drinks. This approach has left his friend, Elysha Daya, genuinely afraid for her life whenever she gets in the car with him. He drives a white Toyota Solara.
 Jordan Paddon, 25 and licensed for eight years, from Scarborough (Toronto), Ontario, has two of the most common major faults seen from drivers on this show-- he acts like a bully on the road, constantly cutting off other drivers and pedestrians, while also spending a lot of time distracted by doing his make-up. His mother, Lorraine Paddon, knows that with these habits it'll be a case of when, not if, he eventually gets into serious trouble. He drives a black Hyundai Santa Fe.
 Polly Sargeant, 61 and licensed for 41 years, from Perth, Ontario (near Ottawa), may be the oldest driver this season, but frequently spends more time doing her make-up and nails than focusing on the road, a flaw more often seen with the show's younger contestants. On top of that, she still remains ignorant about many driving laws and lacks experience driving in the city, which has resulted in her son-in-law, Jeff, nominating her for the sake of her many grandchildren, who she often gives car rides to. She drives a black GMC Terrain.

Synopsis

  The contestant became Canada's Worst Driver.
  The contestant was runner-up for Canada's Worst Driver.
  The contestant was on the panel's shortlist.
  The contestant was not the worst or second-worst driver, but failed to graduate from rehab.
  The contestant graduated.

Episode 1: Ready, Set, Go!
Original airdate: October 26, 2015
The Drive to Rehab: This season, the journey to the Driver Rehabilitation Centre starts from the Cayuga Speedway racing track, with the nine drivers heading to rehab using a provided set of instructions. As part of this season's emphasis on high-speed challenges, the contestants will begin their journey by driving down the track, before joining the public roads. The contestants depart in the following order: Renee, Jordan, Tina, Cameron, Alex, Polly, Jillian, Shmuel and Sholom. Renee is the first to take the drive and proves incredibly nervous whenever there's so much as one other car on the road with her. During the course of her drive, she makes the same vow that Canada's Worst Driver Ever "winner" Kevin Simmons and Canada's Worst Driver 10 "runner-up" Siham Martell did-- by saying that should she be named the worst, she will destroy her driving license and give up driving permanently. Jordan is second to take the journey and his self-confessed lack of attention is demonstrated when he's so busy giving his hair a last-minute styling that he fails to notice Andrew signaling him to start his drive. He subsequently spends nearly the entire drive staring at his cellphone. Tina is next and spends most of the journey driving well above the speed limit, sometimes even double the limit. It's also revealed that during her introductory video, she stopped at a friend's house for five minutes to down a vodka cooler and knock back a shot of liquor before going back on the road. Cameron also speeds a lot during his drive, though does follow Andrew's advice not to use his phone at the wheel, a common problem in his everyday driving. Alex is the third driver in a row who spends most of the journey speeding and he also eats and drinks during the course of the drive, much to Elysha's concern. Despite the 36-year age gap, Polly shows much the same set of issues as Alex, not being quite so reckless, but speeding, lighting cigarettes and using her phone while driving. Jillian proves even more nervous than Renee and it's also revealed that she made the same vow as Renee-- that should she be named the worst, she will destroy her driving license and give up driving permanently. Shmuel and Sholom are the last to leave the Speedway and since they only have one car between them, Sholom drives the first half of the journey to rehab and Shmuel the second half. When they arrive, they are provided with a second car so that they can both park up and while Shmuel does this with no trouble at all, Sholom has major difficulties. Everyone makes a large number of moving violations on the way to rehab and the contestants arrive in the following order: Tina, Jordan (constantly staring at his cellphone), Renee, Alex (speeding most of the way), Cameron (speeding most of the way), Jillian, Polly, Shmuel and Sholom.
First to Arrive: Tina was the third to leave, but the first to arrive.
Last to Arrive: Sholom and Shmuel were the last, but only because they only had one car between them and both needed to park.
Charger Challenge: Basic Assessment: For this season, the drivers will have a brand new Dodge Charger LX as their recurring challenge car, the most powerful example of such a car seen so far on the show. The first challenge for the drivers is the basic assessment, which has stayed the same with minor variations since the eighth season; in order, they have to reverse the Charger through a corridor of wheel rims, turn it around in a section made up of concrete traffic barriers and blocks and then drive it in a slalom around five foam people at 60 km/h. During his demonstration, Andrew realizes that the barriers are a little too narrow and so has the crew widen them-- only for a downpour to then follow, which will make the slalom much harder. Sholom is the first to take the challenge and spends most of it arguing with Shmuel, along with continuing to show his complete lack of reversing skills. Bizarrely, he decides to take the slalom at an even faster speed than recommended, though comes surprisingly close to passing it, only failing because he went too fast to drive between the final pair of people. Shmuel doesn't fare any better, doing just as badly if not worse when reversing, causing just as much damage if not more than Sholom when turning the car around and then failing the slalom because he took it far too slowly. Polly spends most of the first section with her foot on the gas and brake at the same time and ends up rupturing a tire on the wheel rims. She then badly damages the Charger's front bumper in the concrete barriers and comes close to passing the slalom, but hits the second-last foam person. Tina becomes the first driver to pass part of the assessment, flawlessly turning the car around, but still knocks over a lot of wheel rims and then tries to take the slalom at 80 km/h, resulting in her spinning out of control. Alex's reverse is the best so far, only knocking down one set of wheel rims, but he does poorly while turning the car around and then narrowly fails the slalom when he smashes the Charger's wing mirror on a foam person. During her attempt, Renee reveals that she watched previous seasons of the show to brush up on how to do the challenges; this does not seem to help her at all, however, as she has major problems with front-end swing throughout her reverse, then rips off the Charger's already-damaged front bumper while turning it around in the concrete maze. A thick fog then descends on the course and Andrew gives her the option of skipping the slalom, but she insists on doing it anyway, only to fail by smashing the second-last figure. For Jillian's run, Andrew makes Mitchell step out of the car so that she can do it alone; she then has massive trouble getting through the course, breaking down in tears on multiple occasions and needing much prompting just to get the Charger to the required speed on the slalom. Cameron has the best performance of the day, not hitting the car once in the first two sections; his slalom run is perhaps the worst, however, as he completely loses control and destroys every single foam person before spinning out at the end of the course. Jordan, by contrast, is by far the worst performer at this challenge, as he takes 45 minutes just to get halfway through the wheel rims before giving up and refuses to even attempt to turn the car around in the maze and while he actually attempts the slalom (which isn't shown), it's indicated that he failed it at the end of his run. During their first meetings with the experts, all nine contestants deny the possibility that they might be Canada's Worst Driver. As usual, no one graduates in the first episode, as it merely serves as a skills evaluation.

Web Extra: The Road to Rehab: The nine nominees each share their experiences during their drive to rehab. Jordan, Renee and Jillian each blame their nominators for providing bad directions, though Cameron admits that his repeatedly getting lost was his own fault. Tina and Ashley blame each other for their trouble getting to rehab, while Shmuel and Sholom both admit to being equally at fault. Alex accuses Elysha of not doing her job of reading the directions and Elysha in turn accuses Alex of speeding so much that she was never able to give him the directions in time. Polly also blames her nominator, albeit more reluctantly than Tina and Jeff does admit to being responsible for at least one instance of them getting lost. Jacque raises concerns about Renee's eyesight and suggests that she use glasses or contacts, a suggestion Renee laughs off.

Episode 2: Left Right Green Light
Original airdate: November 2, 2015
Head-to-Head Reversing: The first real challenge of the season has the drivers paired off into two Ford Crown Victorias and required to reverse down a lane marked with wheel rims and wooden barriers, turn the car around in a large turning area and then reverse back down their lane; in a new twist on the challenge, however, their starting lanes are directly opposite each other, rather than being in parallel. Before the challenge, Tim will give each pair a lesson in reversing. Jordan and Renee make up the first pair and after hitting a set of wheel rims early on, Jordan panics and floors the gas, taking out much of the course in the process. Renee fares a little better, but still has a lot of minor hits; Andrew also calls her out on sitting far too close to the steering wheel, which would cause the airbag to severely injure or possibly even kill her if it deployed. Jillian and Polly both take some time to get going, after initially not being able to put their cars in reverse. Jillian initially has a lot of trouble due to her nervousness and so Andrew ejects Mitchell from the car and has her drive back and forth up the starting lane; while she has a few minor bumps during the process, she's nonetheless deemed to have passed, thanks to getting over her nerves. Polly never once looks out the back window and while she doesn't actually do too much damage to the course, she fails for not following the lesson. Alex and Cameron are next and both their runs end in failure, with Alex driving recklessly and hitting things throughout and Cameron doing a little better, but causing several hits while turning the car around in the middle. Tina faces Shmuel and Sholom in the last round. Tina is easily the best performer in the challenge, passing without making a single mistake, but Sholom has major trouble even getting the car to move and hits multiple things in the middle section; Shmuel does better than his brother after they swap at the halfway point, but ruins what would otherwise have been a pass by hitting the barriers near the finish line.
Best Performer: Tina, who passed the challenge flawlessly.
Worst Performer: Jordan, for causing more damage to the course than anyone else (Sholom was almost as bad, but only did half of his run before swapping with Shmuel).
Riding the Rails: In a new variation on the "Running the Rails" challenge seen in previous seasons, the drivers have to drive a Jeep Wrangler over two sets of rails, with the first going under the car's right wheels and the second (which starts a few feet before the first finishes) under the left wheels. The drivers will each have five attempts, unless they get stuck and are unable to drive off, as it will cause them to instantly fail. Cameron uses up his first two attempts just getting onto the rails and on his third attempt, he falls off and gets stuck, causing him to fail. Tina nearly passes on her first attempt, but gets overconfident and goes too fast, which causes her to fall off and get stuck. Alex fails in exactly the same way as Tina, though, unlike her, he admits that he got too cocky. Jillian passes without any real difficulty, reinforcing Mitchell's belief that she is a capable driver and that her real problem is her nervousness on the road. Jordan doesn't make a real effort in the challenge; like Cameron, he needs two attempts just to get on the rails and then gets stuck on his third attempt, all the while laughing at his failures. Renee initially does well, but then speeds and drifts to the right, causing her to fall off and get stuck. Sholom proves the worst so far and uses up all five attempts without ever getting more than a few feet up the ramp. As with the previous challenge, Shmuel does better than his brother, but still fares poorly, falling off on the first two attempts and then getting completely stuck on the third. Polly does the first half of the challenge well, but needlessly starts jerking the steering wheel around halfway, causing her to fall off and get stuck.
Best Performer: Jillian, who was the only driver who passed.
Worst Performer: Sholom, who was the only driver not to even be able to get the car on the rails.
Charger Challenge: The Shoulder-Check Challenge: After a lesson in shoulder-checking from Philippe, the drivers have to drive the Charger down a lane at 75 km/h, check over their shoulder for a sign indicating which lane they should turn into and then navigate around a stack of boxes into the correct lane. In a twist however, both lanes will be marked as open, to make sure the drivers actually check over both shoulders. Polly doesn't even make it all the way down the lane, as she pulls the wheel to the right when she shoulder-checks in that direction and ends up crashing into the barriers. Renee is so nervous about the speeds involved that she initially doesn't want to do the challenge and so Andrew gives her a personal demonstration of how to do it, before getting to drive at 100 km/h down the other end of the track. When Renee actually does the challenge, however, she fails by calling out the left lane as red instead of green and then turns too early and smashes the last lane barrier. Alex bizarrely calls out the left sign as "yellow" rather than green, but otherwise carries out the challenge correctly and Andrew agrees to let his mistake slide and call it a pass. For Tina's run, the left-hand sign is changed to being red; she nonetheless passes flawlessly. Despite her continuing nervousness, Jillian also passes without any major problems. Shmuel correctly carries out the shoulder-checks, but steers too late and clips the boxes in the middle, causing him to fail; Andrew also brings attention to his wearing sandals while driving, which he warns Shmuel is not an ideal choice of footwear. Sholom takes the course far too fast (at 100 km/h), only checks over one shoulder and then spins wildly out of control at the end. Cameron makes much the same set of mistakes as Sholom and also panics and pumps the brakes, causing him to spin out of control and destroy a large chunk of the course, which also smashes the Charger's front headlights. Shockingly, Jordan becomes the third driver in a row to make this set of mistakes and ends up losing control even more wildly than either Cameron or Sholom (if that's even possible), thanks to him both pumping the brakes and hitting the gas at the same time. 
Best Performer: Jillian and Tina, who both passed the challenge flawlessly (Alex also passed, but called out the sign's colour incorrectly).
Worst Performer: Even though he, Jordan and Sholom all span wildly out of control during their runs, Cameron smashed one of the Charger's headlamps as well.
While Jillian seems the obvious frontrunner to graduate, as she passed every single challenge this episode, she tells the panel that she'd prefer to stay in rehab in order to get more confidence, as she still feels unable to face driving in public. Tina and Alex both express the desire to graduate and the panel note that both are clearly capable of driving well (Tina doing so around motorcyclists due to being an occasional biker herself and Alex being more considerate when driving his grandmother, Pearl), but have doubts over their attitudes. The remaining drivers all admit that they should stay in rehab. Tim votes that Tina should graduate based on her overall better performance in the episode, while Philippe prefers graduating Alex, pointing to Tina's angry, defensive reaction when the panel initially confronted her on her attitude toward driving. Shyamala sides with Tim and Cam with Philippe, leaving Andrew with the deciding vote. In the end, Andrew makes a shock decision and decides that both are equally worthy of graduating, making this the first episode to have a double-graduation since Jodi Slobodesky and Sean McConnell in the penultimate episode of the second season. Before they leave, however, Andrew gives Alex a cardboard cut-out of his grandmother, Pearl, to ensure that he always drives as if she's with him and also confiscates the "If you don't like my driving, f*** off" sign from Tina's car.

Web Extra: Road Signs: In order to make this annual test of drivers' knowledge a little harder, they will only be given brief glimpses of several safety-related road signs, which they then have to identify. While none of the drivers perform well on this test, Renee does the worst, failing to correctly identify a single sign, while Polly fares a little better, only getting two right.

Episode 3: Turtle! Turtle!
Original airdate: November 9, 2015
The Trough: For this year's incarnation of one of the show's longest-running challenges, the drivers must navigate a Suzuki Sidekick through a trough made up of concrete Jersey barriers placed on their side without falling off. The challenge requires understanding of wheel position and front-end swing, with each driver getting just two attempts. Jordan is first and fails his initial attempt almost immediately when he falls off. After Andrew explains the idea of front-end swing to him, Jordan does much better on his second turn and nearly passes, but falls off near the end, though is nonetheless credited for understanding the lesson. It's a very similar story for Cameron, who quickly fails his first attempt; after getting the same demonstration as Jordan, he passes his second attempt with ease. Shmuel also fails his first attempt and after he and Sholom get their front-end swing demonstration, he nearly passes his second attempt, but fails after overcompensating and turning too wide on the penultimate turn. Despite getting the demonstration before either of his turns, Sholom fails both his attempts almost immediately, falling off on the first turn. Renee's performance is essentially the same as Cameron's, quickly failing her first attempt, but easily passing the second. Polly quickly fails both her attempts after misinterpreting Jeff's advice and trying to take the corners tighter than she normally would. Jillian continues her flawless run of challenges by passing on the first attempt, this time without even needing anything explained to her.
Best Performer: Jillian, who was the only driver to pass on her first attempt.
Worst Performer: Sholom, for failing both his runs almost immediately even though he was the only driver to get the lesson before either run.
Reverse Figure-Eight: Continuing on the theme of front-end swing, the drivers are tasked with reversing a 1976 Chrysler Town & Country station wagon through a figure-eight course made up of wheel rims and garbage cans. Use of the driver's side mirror will be paramount to succeeding here. Polly is the first to take the challenge and has major trouble getting to grips with it, even attempting to quit early on. Andrew forces her to continue, but he has to guide her throughout and it takes her 26 minutes to finish, with a significant number of hits. Cameron gets through the course relatively quickly, thanks to his insistence on not stopping, though this does still cause him to hit three things. Jordan does poorly throughout his run, mostly due to his eyesight problems and not yet having a pair of glasses. Shmuel does most of the challenge flawlessly, but very slowly. Near the end of his run, Andrew tells him to pretend that there's an ambulance coming and he needs to quickly reverse out of its way; despite speeding up, Shmuel completes the course without a single hit. Jillian's so-far-flawless track record quickly comes crashing down, as she finds this challenge far more stressful than any of the others and starts hitting things almost immediately. She angrily lashes out throughout the challenge and posts the worst run so far. Renee has trouble initially, but soon gets to grips with the challenge; she has numerous hits throughout the challenge, but finishes it relatively quickly and admits to having learned a lot from it. Sholom is last and by far the worst at this challenge (even worse than Jillian, if that's even possible), as he ends up knocking almost everything in the first corner. This causes Jillian (and later, Cameron) to storm out of the car, angrily yelling insults as she does so; Andrew points out that, despite his performance, Sholom is trying and that Jillian's response is uncalled for.
Best Performer: Cameron, who completed the challenge in the shortest time and Shmuel, who had the fewest hits.
Worst Performer: Sholom, who did so badly that Jillian stormed out during his run, followed by all the other drivers at the end.
Charger Challenge: Swerve and Avoid: Philippe gives the drivers an important lesson in how to swerve around suddenly-appearing obstacles, emphasizing the need to avoid hitting the brakes or staring at the obstacle they're trying to avoid. However, Jordan proves unable to even get Philippe's lesson right and so, the show books him an immediate appointment at a local optometrist, who provides him with a new pair of glasses. This year's version of the challenge has the contestants driving the Charger at 75 km/h toward a pair of lanes divided by a wall; a turtle will appear in one lane, forcing the drivers to avoid it. As with the last high-speed challenge, Renee is extremely anxious about the speeds involved (as evidenced by her bio shoot, when she had to pull over while on a highway due to her anxiety and stress) and is tearful; however, thanks to a little confidence booster from Jacque throughout, she passes the challenge, shocking even herself. Sholom's awful run of challenges continues, as he steers directly into the turtle and then leaves the track altogether. Shmuel, for once, does even worse than his brother, as he not only steers directly towards the turtle, he speeds and pumps the brakes, nearly flipping the car on a chunk of Styrofoam; Andrew brands this probably the worst Swerve and Avoid performance in the show's entire history (surpassing even Sly Grosjeans performance from the seventh season, in which he accelerated to 100 km/h, drove straight ahead and braked, destroying the centre of the course, forcing Andrew to abort the challenge) and reprimands Shmuel for his speeding. Cameron isn't optimistic about his chances, either, but he nonetheless passes with ease. Jillian initially refuses to even attempt the challenge, but Andrew and Mitchell force her to go through with it. Before she makes her run, she berates Mitchell at length, accusing him of being responsible for her inability to face driving (even though Andrew notes that it's only because of Mitchell that she even drives as much as she does). When she eventually takes her run, she passes without trouble, though she insults Mitchell again for good measure. Polly correctly swerves away from the turtle; bizarrely, however, she then floors the gas instead of correcting her course, causing her to travel far off the track and then get stuck in a muddy field, not letting go of the gas until Jeff tells her to. After witnessing this, Andrew suggests that Polly should consider giving up driving. Jordan, using his new glasses for the first time, nearly gets the challenge right, but under-steers and hits the brakes, causing him to spin out of control. 
Best Performer: Cameron, as he passed the challenge with minimal fuss (Jillian and Renee also passed, but still had major issues with their temper and nerves, respectively).
Worst Performer: Shmuel, who completely lost control and destroyed most of the course during his run.
When she meets with the experts, Polly admits to having zoned out during the Swerve and Avoid and Cam informs her of a recent incident where a 66-year-old woman was jailed after hitting and killing two children when she accidentally hit the gas instead of the brakes in a parking lot. Jordan says that his glasses are proving a major help, while Sholom admits that he lucked out in actually getting a driving license. Shmuel initially wants to graduate, but quickly retracts his request after being shown footage of his performance on the Swerve and Avoid. Jillian and Renee both say they don't want to graduate, but Cameron does feel he's learned enough to graduate. The experts quickly agree that Cameron is the overwhelmingly obvious choice to graduate, seeing as how he passed every challenge this episode. Andrew questions the other experts as to whether or not they'd be better not graduating anyone and making Cameron stick around a little longer to fully prove himself, but they ultimately decide that this is not necessary, thus making Cameron the season's third graduate.

Web Extra: The Speed Perception Challenge: In this test, which was also run last year, the drivers each have to drive at 70 km/h toward a wall made up of foam blocks, then brake sharply to avoid hitting them. Since their instrument panels will be blocked, however, they will have to use their instincts to judge their speed. Cameron drives far too fast (at nearly 85 km/h) and crashes through the wall with some force. Jillian maintains precisely 70 km/h throughout her run; unfortunately, she still fails, by leaving it far too late to brake. Sholom takes his run far too slowly and stops over a car length short of the wall, while Shmuel has the opposite problem, speeding and crashing through the wall. Polly, Jordan and Renee are all afraid to drive fast; consequently, none of them drive faster than 50 km/h, stopping well short of the wall, but still failing the challenge.

Episode 4: Nailing The Needle
Original airdate: November 16, 2015
What Do You See?: For the first time since the fifth season (not counting season finales or off-screen practice sessions), the drivers leave the confines of the Driver Rehabilitation Centre for a public drive in the town of Dunnville, in order to get a better idea of how they drive in their everyday lives. Tim will accompany each driver and will ask them to make observations about potential hazards throughout their drive. Jillian, the contestant this challenge is primarily designed to help, is first up, but takes a lot of encouragement from Tim just to even leave the parking lot. During the challenge, she proves extremely nervous and panics at the slightest provocation, along with displaying a lack of practical knowledge on how to drive in public. Despite this, she still insists that she's a good driver, but Tim says that she still has a long way to go. Sholom proves extremely over-cautious, stopping at every single intersection whether or not he's actually required to. Shmuel does well; after being reminded to keep to observing relevant things on the road, he drives competently and is able to keep focused for the remainder of his drive. While Renee doesn't prove anywhere near as nervous as Jillian, she nonetheless keeps focusing far ahead and not identifying vehicles approaching from intersections. On top of that, she also turns out to have no idea what a crosswalk is, causing Tim to point out that stopping in one is a ticketable offense. Jordan initially focuses on the faces of other drivers, but when Tim advises him to look at front wheels instead, he gets the hang of it and performs the best at this challenge. Polly, by contrast, is easily the worst, as she proves generally unobservant and has to be prevented from making a dangerous illegal turn, which would have sent her into the oncoming traffic.
Best Performer: Jordan and Shmuel, who both proved very observant and drove safely during their runs.
Worst Performer: Polly, who didn't get the point of the challenge and nearly turned into an oncoming traffic lane.
Parallel Parking: In order to give the drivers experience in parallel parking tough vehicles, they are given a lesson in parallel parking from Tim and then asked to park a 1976 Cadillac Calais between two other cars. Each driver will have ten attempts. Before Jillian's run, she has a session with Shyamala, who notes that she generally seems tearful when either driving alone or with Andrew or Tim, yet frequently subjects Mitchell to torrents of verbal abuse at the slightest provocation. She admits to resentment at Mitchell's ability to drive without trouble and Mitchell in turn admits to not standing up to her, causing Shyamala to tell them this can't continue, that Jillian needs to control her temper and nerves and Mitchell needs to tell her when she's behaving unreasonably. When she takes the challenge, Jillian fails to use her mirrors and keeps hitting the car behind her, which in turns causes her to lose control of her temper and start lashing out at Mitchell again. This time, Mitchell takes Shyamala's advice and stands up to her, but after hitting the car in front during her fourth run, she tries to quit the challenge. Mitchell persuades her to continue on the condition he stays out of the car, but after she fails her fifth attempt and comes close to a complete breakdown, Andrew decides to accompany her and guides her to successfully completing the challenge on her next run. She's still deemed to have failed, however, since she showed no improvement in her behaviour toward Mitchell, who she tries to place total blame on afterwards. Polly easily passes on her first attempt, getting just within the  required to be legally parked. Jordan also fails all ten attempts, after repeatedly choosing a starting position just a few inches to the side of the car in front of the space. Shmuel takes four attempts, but passes the challenge. Renee has a lot of trouble in her early runs, but gradually gets the hang of the challenge and passes on her eighth attempt.
Best Performer: Polly, as she passed the challenge quicker than anyone else.
Worst Performer: Sholom and Jillian, Sholom repeatedly hitting the other cars during his runs, and Jillian, in spite of a successful parallel parking attempt, showed no improvement in her abusive treatment towards Mitchell.
Distracted Driving: For once, only three of the drivers have any real problems with distracted driving—Shmuel (who tends to eat while driving), Jordan (who regularly texts and browses the internet) and Polly (who does her hair and make-up at the wheel). However, Andrew notes that distracted driving is still one of the leading causes of car-related fatalities and so the three are put through the challenge, which has them driving a 1974 Cadillac Fleetwood through a course, with and without distractions. Jordan is up first and asked to send a text to Andrew while driving; just the task of entering Andrew's number causes him to lose track of his speed and hit things and he's also asked to groom himself and even brush his teeth (which he also did while driving before rehab) to further make the point. After his run ends, he's tearful at the thought of how dangerous his driving is. Polly is asked to do a similar set of grooming tasks, and her run proves similarly destructive, including stopping altogether at one point; Jeff points out how dangerous this would be if she did it on an actual road and she freely admits that she often does so. After her run ends with her crashing and leaving the course, she's left shaken by the thought of what might happen while speeding much higher than the 25 km/h of the challenge. Shmuel starts his run by getting out a cigarette, which causes him to get a garbage can stuck under the car; Andrew pulls out the mangled remains of the can and points to it as proof of what can happen with even the briefest distraction. Shmuel resumes his drive with a cup of hot coffee and ends up puncturing a tire. When he resumes yet again, he tries to send Andrew a text and ends up almost totally destroying the course, after which he vows never to drive distracted again.
Charger Challenge: Eye of the Needle: This year's incarnation of the challenge is a little faster than usual, requiring each driver to navigate the Charger through five foam arches at 80 km/h. Shmuel is first to take the challenge and while he initially speeds, he brings his speed under control after the first arch and successfully completes the challenge. Before her run, Andrew has Renee drive him up the track at 80 km/h, to give her the confidence to complete the actual challenge; unfortunately, she spends most of her run looking at the speedometer instead of where she wants to go and smashes the first three arches. Jordan, who Andrew notes is showing a lot more enthusiasm for the high-speed challenges, goes through the first two arches successfully, but then speeds up to 110 km/h and hits the third and fifth arches after not being able to steer toward them in time. Before Jillian takes her run, Andrew gives her a Shyamala-shaped air freshener with self-help tips written on its back; she passes flawlessly, but admits that she's still some way off graduating. Sholom once again proves the worst by far at this challenge, as he drives at over 100 km/h, smashes all but the first arch and then spins out of control and travels well off the track into the adjoining field. That failure confirmed one thing to Andrew; even though the Hoffman brothers nominated each other as Canada's Worst Driver, Sholom is clearly worse than Shmuel. Polly comes close to passing, but ruins an otherwise good run by smashing the middle arch. 
Best Performer: Jillian, for keeping to the correct speed and passing flawlessly (Shmuel also passed, but drove above the required speed).
Worst Performer: Sholom, for leaving the track entirely and getting the car stuck in the mud.
In her meeting with the experts, Jillian admits that it took her a lot of effort not to yell at Mitchell and that doing so is cathartic to her, but Andrew reminds her that she simply can't continue to do this. Jordan thinks he's learned enough to graduate, as does Shmuel, while the remaining drivers admit that they have a lot more to learn. Despite Jordan's request and also some minor reservations as to whether Jillian should remain in rehab when her problems aren't directly related to her driving skills, Andrew and all four experts agree without hesitation that Shmuel is the obvious choice to graduate, as he passed every challenge this episode, but despite becoming the season's fourth graduate, Shmuel instead steps back and staying as Sholom's nominator, a first for the series.

Episode 5: Slip And Crash
Original airdate: November 23, 2015
Trailer Parking Challenge: After Tim gives each driver a lesson on driving in reverse with a trailer, the candidates are each given 10 opportunities to back a boat trailer, with boat, attached to a Dodge Grand Caravan minivan, around a fairly sharp corner and through a narrow door into one of Dunnville Airport's hangars. Renee is up first and quickly finishes the challenge, only briefly getting slowed down by a minor jackknife at the halfway point. Jordan proves incredibly slow during his run and after an hour of him fruitlessly trying to get the boat into the hangar, Lorraine bails out and has Andrew direct him for the rest of his run; however, this fails to yield results and Jordan eventually quits. Polly fails to make use of her mirrors and repeatedly jackknifes, eventually having to rely on Jeff to make all the decisions; she eventually gets the boat into the hangar, but her run is deemed a failure due to her over-reliance on Jeff. Jillian does almost as well as Renee and gets the boat into the hangar without major difficulty, but then manages to fail her run by crashing the van into the hangar door. Sholom, who has swapped out his glasses for contact lenses, does okay for the first half of the run, but then repeatedly jackknifes while trying to get the boat into the hangar. He nearly succeeds just as the sun begins setting, but jackknifes in the hangar doorway, with the only saving grace of his run being that it wasn't the worst of the day.
Best Performer: Renee and Jillian were the only two people who passed this challenge, but Renee did slightly better.
Worst Performer: Jordan did the worst, taking an hour and ultimately quitting when he couldn't get the boat into the hangar.
The Longest Reverse in the World: A straight  lane is set up with various obstacles on the sides, including cars, concrete barriers, wooden boxes and foam shapes, getting a little wider with each section. The drivers are each told to take it as fast as they reasonably can, but to do it safely. Polly quickly starts hitting things, thanks to her over-steering and veering toward the driver's side, something that Andrew and the experts note is unusual given that the vast majority of bad drivers usually hit on the passenger side. At the end, she admits that she was staring at the driver's side obstacles rather than where she wanted to go. Sholom has a similar set of issues, over-steering and looking from side-to-side rather than at the end of the course and he posts a similarly poor run. Renee does well for most of her run, but gets increasingly flustered, eventually causing her to leave the course altogether and nearly hit the camera car. Jordan has the best run of the day, only hitting two objects late in the course. Jillian starts off well, but her run rapidly falls apart after she hits a parked car early on. Despite Andrew and Mitchell's best efforts, Jillian becomes overwhelmed with stress and ends up hitting a lot of things during her run. After this, Andrew decides to send her on a public drive with Tim and for the most part, she proves far less nervous than she did during the previous episode's public drive, even though she gets nervous while handling lane changes.
Best Performer: Jordan, who only hit two things.
Worst Performer: Renee, as she left the course and nearly hit the camera car.
Charger Challenge: Icy Corner: In an example of the mantra of the show, "Look Where You Want to Go," the candidates are given a lesson by Philippe on avoiding a collision on a low-friction surface by locking up the brakes, looking at the opening where they want the car to go, releasing the brake and steering through the opening. The candidates are then given five chances to get around a simulated icy corner. Jillian nearly passes on her first attempt, but needlessly hits the brakes a second time and locks up the wheels, causing her to fail. She then brakes too long on her second attempt and pumps the brakes on the third, before braking too long again on her fourth run. She becomes stressed and tries to quit at this point, but Andrew calms her down and makes her take her final run, which again ends in failure when she brakes too long and stares at the wall. Jordan doesn't steer at all in his first run and goes straight into the wall; he then brakes too long in his next two runs, then turns too early in his fourth run and fails to let go of his brake at all in his last run. Polly passes easily on her first attempt, much to the shock of Andrew, Jeff and all four experts. Prior to Renee's run, Jacque admits that seeing this challenge in previous seasons saved her from getting into an accident a year previously and Cam and Tim also comment about how they've had members of the public thank them for the useful tips. Renee ultimately fails all five or her runs due to braking too long and over-steering. Prior to his run, Sholom is given a sign reminding him to look where he wants to go, which he had specifically requested in an earlier episode; he duly fails his first run by over-speeding and his next three by under-steering. Andrew decides to stand near the end of the corner to remind him where he wants to look (and thereby drive toward) and he nearly passes, but pumps the brakes and spins out of control. 
Best Performer: Polly, who had the only pass in the challenge.
Worst Performer: Jillian; all the drivers except Polly were practically as bad as each other, but Jillian attempted to give up prior to her last run.
Despite the generally very poor performances of everyone in this episode, with only three challenge passes in total (Renee on the first challenge, Jordan on the second and Polly on the third), Jordan and Polly put themselves forward to graduate. Jillian, meanwhile, admits that she should be forced to take more challenges by herself in order to build up her confidence. While the experts consider Jillian the best overall of the remaining drivers, her failure to pass a challenge this episode and admitting to still having confidence issues rules her out as a feasible candidate for graduation. Jordan and Polly are shortlisted simply because they were the only people who wanted to graduate and Jordan receives the half-hearted backing of Shyamala and Cam, while Philippe and Tim just as unenthusiastically support Polly. On further discussion, it's pointed out that Jordan quit the trailer challenge and performed disastrously in the Icy Corner, while Polly had a similarly disastrous run in the reversing challenge and overall seems a much less attentive driver than Jordan. In the end, the experts agree that no one did well enough to be seriously considered for graduation, meaning that the episode ends with nobody leaving rehab.

Episode 6: Soaked And Wet
Original airdate: November 30, 2015
Canada's Worst Parking Lot: For this challenge, each driver is placed in control of a different type of car and they are all sent at the same time into a simulated parking lot. Spaces will periodically open up and the drivers must reverse into an open parking space in one clean move in order to pass. If drivers fail an attempt for any reason, they must take a "penalty lap" around the periphery of the course before making another attempt. Renee gets parked almost immediately and easily passes. Polly also gets parked quite quickly, though she asks to continue in the challenge and get more experience of parking successfully, which Andrew agrees to. Jordan has a lot more trouble and on his first attempt, he is incredibly slow and hits the car behind him; his second attempt doesn't go much quicker, but he does eventually get parked properly. Jillian has a lot of trouble to begin with, as she hits the car behind on her first attempt and as soon as she completes the penalty lap, her car breaks down, forcing her to switch to the car that Renee had been driving. She nearly gets parked correctly on her second go, but hits the car behind her again, forcing her to take another penalty lap. On her third attempt, she finally gets parked correctly, but her overall performance is judged as not worthy of a pass. Sholom never once comes close to parking correctly and, as the last driver remaining on the course, fails the challenge by default.
Best Performer: Renee and Polly, who both got parked up quickly with minimal fuss.
Worst Performer: Sholom, as he was the only driver who couldn't get parked up.
The Water Tank Challenge: In this year's variation of the challenge, the drivers have to drive a Volkswagen New Beetle with a shark-inspired livery and roof-mounted water tank down a straight section of road at 50 km/h, then through a course of wheel rims, over a pair of rails, then stop before they hit a suddenly-appearing baby carriage and finally turn the car around in a section made up of concrete Jersey barriers and blocks. Despite his best efforts, Andrew loses  during the course of his demonstration, mostly because this year's incarnation is designed to soak drivers who spent too much time going up or down the rails. Sholom is the first to take the challenge and loses a lot of water on the initial straight section thanks to uneven acceleration and sharp braking. He gets through the wheel rims without hitting anything, although he misses the rails altogether, causing him to lose even more water. After that, Sholom hits the baby carriage and pushes it all the way to the concrete barriers, where he breaks the foam tail fin that has been attached to the car's rear. Polly doesn't fare much better, losing a lot of water on the initial straight after failing to brake at all and then accelerating and braking erratically throughout her run; she loses . Jordan gets off to a bad start by braking sharply at the end of the initial straight, but after that, he loses even less than Andrew did in the corresponding parts of his demonstration and has an overall water loss of just , by far the best performance of the day. Renee does well initially, but she rapidly loses her nerve (and a huge amount of water) when she hits the baby carriage at some speed. Jillian is exempt from this challenge, as the experts are not worried about her pedal control; instead, Andrew drives her and Mitchell into Welland, Ontario, then asks her to drive a, five-minute route to a Tim Hortons on Niagara Street, guided by a talking GPS unit, this time without anyone else in the car. She proves so nervous that it takes her ten minutes just to get going and during the journey, she goes considerably off-course, though thanks to the GPS' turn-by-turn navigation, it does not take too long for her to get to her destination. Once she arrives, Andrew asks her to make the same journey again, this time in reverse, but she declines, claiming that she's too nervous to do so.
Best Performer: Jordan, who lost only slightly more water than Andrew did in his demonstration.
Worst Performer: Sholom, who he lost more water than anyone else.
Charger Challenge: Reverse Flick: Philippe gives each of the drivers a lesson in how to unbalance the car with a swift, slight turn of the steering wheel and then spin it around 180° with a larger turn of the wheel. The drivers are then given five chances to reverse the Charger into a turning area bordered by foam blocks and spin it around in the area. Sholom is up first and defies the dire predictions of Andrew and the experts by succeeding on his first attempt, finally passing a challenge (ironically, this was also the only challenge Canada's Worst Driver 5 "winner" Angelina Marcantognini passed during her season, even exactly the same day the episodes premiered, although she needed Andrew's help). Actually getting the car into the turning area proves to be Renee's major issue, as it takes her until her fourth attempt to get in there without hitting the entry lane markers; once she actually does so, however, she passes with ease. Andrew then tells her that with all the extra lessons that Jillian's been getting to help with her anxiety, it's only fair that Renee get the same for her fear of the highway. She's then sent with Tim for a drive on-and-off the Chedoke Expressway, which she then has to repeat three times; though she's initially very nervous, by her fourth and final run, she's able to handle being on the expressway relatively calmly. Jordan fails his first attempt when he fails to steer in the reverse portion and hits the entry lane barriers, but on his second attempt, he manages to pass despite not quite turning the car around fully. Polly fails to get into the turning space in four out of her five runs and in the remaining run, doesn't turn the wheel nearly far enough and skids through one of the side walls. After her run ends, Polly admits that her reversing is so bad that she had to cut down two trees next to her driveway at home, as she was constantly hitting them. Jillian also hits the entry barriers in her first run, after which Mitchell volunteers to monitor her speed while she focuses on where she's going; however, Andrew overhears this and orders him out of the car for the rest of her run. All her subsequent attempts end with her needlessly hitting the brakes, which causes her to lose control and repeatedly crash through the walls. 
Best Performer: Sholom, who defied expectations by passing on his first attempt.
Worst Performer: Jillian and Polly, as neither of them came close to passing.
In her meeting with the experts, Jillian admits that she's still not ready to face the roads, although she is also confident that she is not Canada's Worst Driver. Sholom also admits that he's nowhere near ready to graduate, as does Polly, who asks for the same public lessons that Jillian and Renee have been getting. Renee wants to graduate, though admits that she doesn't quite feel confident enough to take her son on the highway and wants to get used to doing it herself first, which perturbs the experts. Jordan also wants to graduate, feeling beyond any doubt that he is ready to drive in public again; Cam also compliments him on the huge improvement he's shown in his previously selfish attitude. Andrew and Shyamala favour graduating Jordan for being more confident in himself, while Cam and Tim feel that Renee deserves to graduate for her superior technical abilities; Philippe is therefore left with the deciding vote. At the graduation ceremony, Andrew tells Renee that while there was a strong case to be made for letting her go this episode, she ultimately talked herself out of graduating by admitting that she lacked the confidence to take her son on the highway. Jordan is therefore this episode's graduate and he vows to never again be as blatantly selfish as he was before coming to rehab.

Episode 7: Easy as Pie
Original airdate: December 7, 2015
The Cross: As usual, this challenge requires the drivers to use S-turns to gradually turn their vehicle 360° in a cross made up of concrete Jersey barriers and blocks. For this year's incarnation of the challenge, however, they will be using a much larger vehicle: a Wayne Lifeguard bus made up to look like a train. Jillian is the first to take the challenge and immediately demands that Mitchell guide her throughout. He initially refuses, which leads to yet another argument between the couple, but eventually she gets through the first corner, guided every step of the way by him. Andrew quickly cottons onto this and drags Mitchell off the bus, after which Jillian's confidence (and, thereby, her run as a whole) quickly falls apart. While this is happening, both Andrew and Shyamala note that while Jillian is arguably the most technically competent driver ever to be a contestant on the show, her nerves are proving a seemingly insurmountable problem. Sholom (the only male nominee remaining after Jordan graduated last episode) starts his run by adjusting his mirrors, but not only does it incorrectly (meaning that he can't see his own vehicle), he fails to actually use them; his run predictably proves to be a complete disaster, with both Andrew and Cam expressing amazement that Sholom ever got a driving license. Polly turns out not to even know how to properly steer in reverse and her run doesn't go any better than Sholom's. During her run, Renee has Jacque stand outside the bus and tell her how close she is to the barriers, which Andrew considers to be acceptable since Renee is still making her own decisions. She subsequently gets through with only a few minor scrapes, posting by far the best performance in this challenge. After this, it's revealed firstly that Polly and Sholom are now also getting the same public driving lessons that Jillian and Renee have been getting and also that Renee is now able to drive by herself on the highway.
Best Performer: Renee, who completed the challenge with only a few hits.
Worst Performer: Polly and Sholom, who both experienced a huge number of hits (Jillian did almost as poorly as them, but was at least able to do the first corner with Mitchell's help).
Forward Handbrake J-Turn: After Philippe gives each of the drivers a lesson in how to quickly spin the car around with a handbrake turn, they each have to use this technique to quickly turn a 2002 Honda Civic around in a confined space, while also avoiding a foam person (which features the face of their nominator) in the middle of the space. Each driver gets three chances. Polly's first run quickly turns into a complete disaster, as she carries out the turn far too late and then accidentally floors the gas instead of hitting the brakes, causing her to spin violently out of control. Between this, the similar incident in the Swerve and Avoid and her admission that this is a mistake she often makes outside the show, Andrew voices his opinion that Polly should seriously consider giving up driving. Her remaining two runs prove just as disastrous, as she repeats exactly the same mistake on her second run and then fails to brake at all in her third run. Renee's first two attempts are near-misses, as she only manages to turn the car about 4/5 of the way around. She does only slightly better on her third and final run, but she and Jacque feel it's worthy of a pass; Andrew isn't so certain, however. Sholom predicts that he'll pass on his first attempt, but his confidence proves misplaced and he fails by trying to take the turn too tight. He makes the same mistake on his second run and then pulls the brake far too late in his third, failing altogether. Jillian is forced to drive by herself from the very start and she remains relatively calm in her first run, but fails by trying to take the turn too late. This causes her to completely lose her nerve and she asks to have Mitchell back in the car, but Andrew refuses to allow this and explains in detail where she went wrong. Her second attempt is better, but still ends in failure when she turns too tight. She tries to quit after this, but is coaxed into making a third attempt, which again turns out to be better than the previous run but still a failure, as she turns too late and hits the far wall. Despite this, Mitchell and Jillian admit that she is handling the situation better than she would have earlier in the season and are fighting less.
Best Performer: Renee, since her run was only slightly out from what was required.
Worst Performer: Polly, for twice hitting the gas instead of the brake and losing control of the car.
This was originally scheduled to be the Charger challenge for this episode, but Andrew says that in order to keep the Charger working until the following episode's Mega Challenge, they'll be using the 1976 Town & Country station wagon, with a roof-load of mounted luggage. Renee manages the initial slalom without any trouble, but then asks for a  reduction between the figures, which causes her to smash one of the figures in her second run. Sholom can't even complete the initial slalom, due to his hand-over-hand steering, but wisely asks for the gap between the figures not to be reduced for his second run, which also ends in failure, due to his steering unbalancing the car, though Andrew notes that while Sholom may be a terrible driver, he's at least aware of his issues. Polly goes somewhat under the 80 km/h target speed in her first run, but otherwise passes it without any real trouble. However, she then asks for the same 5 m reduction as Renee and during her second run, she hits the second-last foam person, then closes her eyes and stops steering altogether, causing her to hit the last person dead-on. While the prior three contestants were taking the challenge, Shyamala took Jillian out into Dunnville and got her to undertake three short drives guided by a GPS unit, which she managed to complete despite still being extremely nervous. When she returns to rehab, she admits that she might now have enough confidence to drive in public, but tells Andrew that she wants to take part in the final Road Test in order to prove once and for all that she can drive alone, which Andrew agrees to. When she actually takes this challenge, however, she drives too fast in her initial run and ends up leaving the slalom altogether. She then asks to take her second run at a reduced speed of 50 km/h with the same figure spacing and she completes it flawlessly. 
Best Performer: Jillian, since she understood the point of the challenge and passed her second run. Sholom was also given credit for understanding the lesson, though failed both his runs.
Worst Performer: Polly, for insisting on an unrealistic reduction in the figure distance and then closing her eyes and freezing up during her second run.
Renee admits to the experts that they did the right thing by denying her graduation in the last episode and that she now has the confidence to take her son on the highway. Sholom immediately admits that he deserves to be in the final, as does Polly, albeit slightly more reluctantly. Jillian, meanwhile, reiterates her request to stay in rehab for the final episode, believing that if she can complete the road test without anyone else in the car, it'll prove once and for all that she's capable of driving every day. With the agreement between Jillian and Andrew that she will take part in the final road test and Polly and Sholom ruled out as serious contenders for graduation due to their all-around dreadful performances this episode, the experts immediately come to the obvious decision and make Renee this season's penultimate graduate, ensuring that, for the seventh year in a row, there will not be an all-female finale.

Note: This episode did not display an opening title screen or broadcast the opening animation.

Episode 8: The Checkered Flag
Original airdate: December 14, 2015
 The Forward and Reverse Slalom: For this last traditional challenge, run in both the eighth season and the previous season, the drivers have to drive a 1968 Pontiac Parisienne (something which visibly despairs Andrew, who is a big fan of this particular model) through a foam arch and then slalom around a set of foam pedestrians, both forwards and in reverse. Each driver gets 10 attempts and must finish the challenge within 45 seconds. Sholom is up first and his first few attempts prove incredibly slow before he manages to get the car stuck on one of the foam blocks bordering the course on his fourth attempt, forcing Shmuel, Jeff and Mitchell to push the car off the foam block. After that mishap, his runs do gradually improve and he comes very close to passing on his eighth and tenth attempts, but either clips or completely destroys the starting archway, a performance that was better than he and most of the observers were expecting, but still a failure. Jillian's first four attempts go almost as poorly as Sholom's corresponding attempts before Andrew and Mitchell theorize that the presence of Sholom and Polly in the car is making her nervous and has them get out. After that, Jillian passes with ease on her next attempt, preventing a bonus round from happening when none of them could complete the Forward and Reverse Slalom in a combined 30 attempts, leading Andrew to propose a first-ever bonus round in that season, in which all three finalists would succeed on their first attempt). Polly also proves extremely slow on most of her attempts and also obliviously clips the arch and/or the foam people in the process. For her final run, Polly asks to have a "running start" some way back from the arch. Andrew agrees to start the timer after Polly passes the arch, only for her to instantly fail by smashing the arch right as her run starts. Despite Polly's performance in this challenge ultimately being the worst, everyone present states their opinion that Sholom will be Canada's Worst Driver.
Best Performer: Jillian, who had the only pass.
Worst Performer: Polly, who never came close to passing.
Charger Challenge: The Mega Challenge: This year's incarnation of the Mega Challenge is largely the same as those used in the previous two seasons, beginning with an Eye of the Needle and Slalom combo, followed by a precision drive forwards and then backwards through a short course of wheel rims (turning the car around in a section of concrete Jersey barriers in the middle), before attempting a reverse flick and then navigating a short second Eye of the Needle course into an Icy Corner. Polly gets off to a decent start, carrying out the Eye of the Needle and Slalom combo flawlessly and only hitting two things in the forward precision steering section, but things quickly start going wrong when she turns the car around, as she hits 12 times before hitting several things while reversing. She then fails to even make it into the turning space for the Reverse Flick before hitting an arch in the second Eye of the Needle, before her run ends in a disaster as she speeds, locks up her brakes and understeers on the Icy Corner, smashing through the wall. Jillian goes too slowly on the Eye of the Needle and Slalom (though doesn't hit anything), before hitting several things in the precision steering section, albeit while doing a much better job of turning the car around than Polly. She then fails the Reverse Flick by understeering, breaks the Charger's passenger-side wing mirror in the second Eye of the Needle and then speeds and brakes too late in the Icy Corner. Sholom gets off to a terrible start, smashing two of the arches (and another passenger-side wing mirror) in the opening section, but does navigate the Charger through the first precision steering section and turn it around in the concrete barriers without hitting anything. He hits a lot of things while reversing however and while he comes closest to passing the Reverse Flick, he fails it by clipping the barrier leading into the turning section. He also comes the closest to passing the Icy Corner, but fails after steering too late and hitting near the end of the boxes.
Best Performer: Jillian; while the experts did not feel any of the final three to have done especially well in this challenge, they felt Jillian was most deserving of credit for holding her nerve throughout.
Worst Performer: Polly; she and Sholom were almost as bad as each other, but Sholom at least came close to passing the Reverse Flick and Icy Corner.
Road Test: As with all seasons of the show since the seventh season, the show's decisive drive takes place on the streets of Hamilton, Ontario, this year in a BMW Z4 (E89), with the beginning and ending at the MacMaster Automotive Resource Centre (MARC) parking lot on Longwood Road South. Sholom is up first and, to Andrew's surprise, his drive goes very smoothly at first, getting onto the Chedoke Expressway and then to a supermarket parking lot where he gets parked up (albeit somewhat to one side) without major difficulty. After this, however, he begins committing ticketable offenses, including driving into the oncoming traffic lane, committing several unsafe lane changes, running both a red light and a stop sign and then ending his drive by driving into the starting parking lot through a "Do Not Enter" sign. Ultimately, he commits seven ticketable offenses worth a potential $1,135 in fines had he been caught; Andrew notes that Sholom's final drive is definitely not the worst he's ever experienced, but bad enough that he could still be named Canada's Worst Driver. Polly's drive has a far less smooth start than Sholom, as despite Andrew's warnings, she turns left from the central lane twice in quick succession. She gets through the highway drive without trouble, but her run soon falls apart in downtown Hamilton, as she commits even more illegal turns, drives in a bus lane through a bus terminal, holds up traffic at a green light at the intersection of Main Street West and James Street South for several minutes due to her being in the wrong lane (and then gets out of her predicament by running the red light when it comes on) and making several unsafe lane changes, committing two moving violations at once. Her run ultimately proves even worse than Sholom's, with nine ticketable offenses worth a potential $1,345 in fines had she been caught. Jillian is the final person to take the drive, which she is supposed to take alone, guided by a GPS, with Andrew following in the camera car. However, she immediately admits that she's far too nervous to even consider doing this. Andrew then offers to accompany her in the traditional manner, but she also proves too nervous to even attempt this and breaks down in tears over her inability to drive. Andrew suggests that maybe she should consider giving up driving, but she's torn between her desire to continue to drive and her extreme fears. With it obvious to both that Jillian cannot attempt the full road test by herself, Andrew offers to drive her the first section of the test (up to the supermarket parking lot) and then have her drive the same part herself, which she ultimately does successfully despite her nerves and reliance on Andrew to guide her every step of the way. Finally, Andrew drives Jillian to a side street and then leaves her with the GPS set to guide her back to the parking lot, so that she can at least do something resembling the intended solo drive. While she's able to eventually complete the drive, she remains incredibly nervous and tearful throughout, which causes her to make several wrong turns, though with the help of the GPS, she eventually makes it back to the parking lot. However, even though Jillian completed the road test, the experts do not consider this to be a successful one, as Cam points out that neither Sholom nor Polly had any such help from Andrew during their runs. 
Best Performer: Sholom, who completed a third of the test without making any major errors and even afterwards committed fewer ticketable offenses than Polly did.
Worst Performer: Jillian, by default, as she was unable to take the intended test due to her nerves. Between the two who actually did take the full test, Polly did worse, by committing more ticketable offenses than Sholom and briefly causing a traffic jam.
In their final meeting with the experts, the three remaining drivers are asked whether they are Canada's Worst Driver; Sholom admits that he probably is, Jillian attempts to evade the question before saying that she isn't, while Polly angrily says she's not the worst, but that she is a terrible driver. The experts find themselves in the biggest quandary of the season, if not ever-- Sholom, who everyone expected to be the worst after the Forward and Reverse Slalom, is actually the one person who all the experts agree isn't Canada's Worst Driver, as he had the best road test and is the most aware of his limitations as a driver. As for the remaining two, however, while Polly is generally agreed to be an overall worse driver than Jillian, the fact remains that Jillian wasn't even able to attempt the final road drive. Shyamala and Philippe feel that Polly's obliviousness makes her the worst driver, while Andrew and Cam are worried that Jillian's panic attacks are a bigger liability than Polly's obliviousness, once again leaving Tim with the deciding vote. The final three drivers assemble for the trophy presentation and Andrew announces that Sholom has avoided being named the worst, simply because he wasn't as bad as Polly in the challenges and completed his road test. However, his generally very poor track record means that he leaves without graduating, as he passed just one challenge during his time on the show, the Reverse Flick; however, Donna's pass rate prior to being removed from the show on safety grounds was 1/8, with her only pass going 30 km/h on the Shoulder Check Challenge), making him the first third-place driver ever to not graduate (which eventually makes Renee as the Final Graduate), though Andrew tells him that, given more experience and education, he can probably someday become a competent driver. This, therefore, leaves Jillian and Polly as the final two (only the third time in the show's history that both of the final two are women and the second in a row). After Sholom leaves, Andrew regretfully makes the announcement that, in the end, Jillian was named Canada's Worst Driver, something Jillian reacts angrily to, denying that she's worse than Polly (or even Sholom), but Andrew says that Polly completed the final road test, while Jillian didn't and that every other driver who failed to finish the Road Test was named the worst of their season. Andrew returns Polly's license to her and asks Jeff to drive her home, saying that she barely avoided the title and still recommends that she give up driving. Jillian becomes the eleventh person (seventh woman) to be awarded the trophy, the only consolation being that she's felt to have more of a chance of eventually becoming a competent driver than Polly does and that, despite the outcome, her relationship with Mitchell has been improved by the experience, to the point they would get married several months later (Jillian would later return as the nominator for Canada's Worst Driver 13 contestant Ashley Dunne, claiming to have become a much better driver after her time in rehab).

References

External links
 
 

2015 Canadian television seasons
11